Al-Walīd ibn Hishām ibn al-Walīd ibn ʿUqba al-Muʿayṭī was a member of the Umayyad dynasty, a commander in the Arab–Byzantine wars and the governor of Jund Qinnasrin (northern Syria) under Caliph Umar II

Life
Al-Walid ibn Hisham was the grandson of al-Walid ibn Uqba from the Abu Mu'ayt line of the Umayyad clan. In 712/13 he led a raid into Byzantine territory as far as the fortress of Gazelon (called Ghazala by the Arabs) near Amasya in northern Anatolia. According to al-Waqidi, al-Walid alongside Amr ibn Qays al-Kindi led a further expedition against the Byzantines in 716/17, in the course of which several Arab troops from the army of Antioch were slain. He reached as far as the outskirts of Constantinople, where he killed a number of the inhabitants and took several captives. This was during the initial stages of the great Umayyad assault on Constantinople, led by Maslama ibn Abd al-Malik.

Caliph Umar II appointed him the governor of Jund Qinnasrin, and in 718/19 dispatched him to lead the summer campaign against the Byzantines alongside Amr ibn Qays al-Kindi from Jund Hims.

See also
Aban ibn al-Walid ibn Uqba, uncle

References

Bibliography

8th-century Arabs
Umayyad dynasty
Umayyad people of the Arab–Byzantine wars
Umayyad governors of Qinnasrin